The 2022–23 season is the 95th in the history of Real Valladolid and their first season back in the top flight. The club are participating in La Liga and the Copa del Rey.

Players

Transfers

In

Out

Pre-season and friendlies

Competitions

Overall record

La Liga

League table

Results summary

Results by round

Matches 
The league fixtures were announced on 23 June 2022.

Copa del Rey

Statistics

Appearances and goals

|-
! colspan=14 style=background:#dcdcdc; text-align:center| Goalkeepers

|-
! colspan=14 style=background:#dcdcdc; text-align:center| Defenders

 

|-
! colspan=14 style=background:#dcdcdc; text-align:center| Midfielders

|-
! colspan=14 style=background:#dcdcdc; text-align:center| Forwards 

|-
! colspan=14 style=background:#dcdcdc; text-align:center| Players who have made an appearance this season but have left the club

Goalscorers

Last updated: 18 February 2023

Clean sheets

Notes

References

Real Valladolid seasons
Valladolid